APLA is a four-letter acronym that may refer to:

 Azanian People's Liberation Army, the military wing of the Pan Africanist Congress (PAC) in South Africa
 AIDS Project Los Angeles, a Los Angeles-based nonprofit organization
 Anti-phospholipid antibody syndrome, an autoimmune condition that may be seen in systemic lupus erythematosus